Gerhard Theodor Materlik  (born 16 January 1945) is a German physicist and science manager. He has made significant contributions to X-ray physics, notably improvements in the real-world application of synchrotron radiation. He is a Professor of Facilities Science at the University College London since 2013.

Education and early career 
Materlik completed his undergraduate education in physics in Münster and Munich in 1970. He earned his doctorate from the University of Dortmund in 1975. After postdoctoral appointments at Cornell University (1975–1977) and Bell Laboratories, he took a job at the German Electron Synchrotron (DESY) in Hamburg.

Work 
From 2001–2013, Materlik was Chief Executive of the Diamond Light Source, the United Kingdom's synchrotron facility. He was the leader of the team that constructed the accelerators, which speed up electrons to near the speed of light, and also the instrumentation installed to apply this radiation in experiments covering a spectral range from infrared radiation up to X-rays.

His discoveries have become widely used experimental methods. He has published more than 200 papers. He assisted in the development of synchrotron sources worldwide.

Awards and honours 
In 2007, Materlik was awarded a Commander of the Most Excellent Order of the British Empire and became a Fellow of the Institute of Physics. He was elected a Fellow of the Royal Society (FRS) in 2011. His certificate of election reads: 
In 2014 he was awarded the Glazebrook Medal by the Institute of Physics for his leadership in establishing a world-leading laboratory at the Diamond Light Source.

References

External links
 Diamond CEO Prof. Gerd Materlik elected Fellow of the Royal Society

1945 births
Living people
Fellows of the Royal Society
20th-century German physicists
Commanders_of_the_Order_of_the_British_Empire
Technical University of Dortmund alumni
Academics of University College London
21st-century German physicists